Emil Glad (25 June 1929 – 28 August 2009) was a Croatian actor. Glad was a long-time member of Gavella Drama Theatre, from its foundation in 1954 until his retirement in 1994. His film credits include Lapitch the Little Shoemaker and The Magician's Hat.

Filmography

Television roles

Movie roles

References

External links

1929 births
2009 deaths
Croatian male actors
Deaths from cancer in Croatia